The Bridge to Bridge is a water skiing race held on the outskirts of Sydney, Australia. It commences at Brooklyn Bridge and traverses the Hawkesbury River for 112 kilometres to Windsor Bridge. The inaugural event was held in 1961.

Incidents
In 2013 Sarah Teelow was killed after suffering an atlanto-occipital dislocation.

References

Hawkesbury River
Recurring sporting events established in 1961
Sports competitions in New South Wales
Water skiing competitions
1961 establishments in Australia